Irbitsky District is an administrative district (raion), one of the thirty in Sverdlovsk Oblast, Russia. As a municipal division, it is incorporated as Irbitskoye Urban Okrug. Its administrative center is the town of Irbit (which is not administratively a part of the district). Population: 30,331 (2010 Census);

Administrative and municipal status
Within the framework of administrative divisions, Irbitsky District is one of the thirty in the oblast. The town of Irbit serves as its administrative center, despite being incorporated separately as an administrative unit with the status equal to that of the districts.

As a municipal division, the district is incorporated as Irbitskoye Urban Okrug. The Town of Irbit is incorporated separately from the district as Irbit Urban Okrug.

References

Notes

Sources

Districts of Sverdlovsk Oblast

